Rayne is a city in the U.S. state of Louisiana, in Acadia Parish. With a population of 7,326 at the 2020 United States census, it is nicknamed the "Frog Capital of the World", as well as the "Louisiana City of Murals". Rayne is part of the Crowley micropolitan statistical area, and within the Lafayette metropolitan statistical area in Acadiana.

History
An EF2 tornado hit Rayne on March 5, 2011, injuring at least twelve people and killing one person, leveling homes and causing natural gas leaks that prompted evacuations.

Geography
The city is located in Acadiana, and forms part of the Lafayette metropolitan area.

Demographics

As of the 2020 United States census, there were 7,236 people, 2,834 households, and 1,879 families residing in the city. The 2019 American Community Survey estimated 8,041 people and 2,834 households resided in the city.

In 2019, the racial and ethnic makeup of the city was 58.0% non-Hispanic or Latino white, 37.6% Black or African American, 3.3% two or more races, and 1.1% Hispanic and Latin American of any race. At the 2000 United States census, the racial and ethnic makeup of the city was 65.55% White American, 33.52% African American, 0.11% American Indian and Alaska Native, 0.16% Asian, 0.19% from other races, and 0.47% from two or more races; Hispanic and Latin Americans of any race were 0.81% of the population. From 2015 to 2019, the largest Hispanic and Latin American groups were Mexican Americans and stateside Puerto Ricans (0.3% each).

There were 2,834 households and 3,463 housing units at the 2019 American Community Survey. Of the 1,569 occupied housing units, 879 were married couples living together, 97 were male households with no female present, and 137 female households with no male present. The average family size was 3.34, up from 3.22 at the 2000 census, and 38.0% of the population were never married.

In the city, the population was spread out, with 10.9% aged 5 and under, 76.0% aged 18 and older, and 16.6% aged 65 and older. The median age was 40.2 years, up from 34 years in 2000. The largest ancestry groups among the population were French (18.8%), Irish (6.6%), sub-Saharan African (2.1%), German (1.9%), English (1.4%), Scottish (0.9%), and Italian (0.7%). An estimated 10.1% spoke a language other than English at home, and Spanish was spoken by 1.1% of the population; other Indo-European languages were spoken by 8.7% of the population.

At the 2019 American Community Survey, the median household income was $32,266 and the median income for a family was $41,721; married couples had a median income of $53,373 and non-family households were $17,917. About 30.4% of the population lived at or below the poverty line, and 38.2% of the city aged under 18 lived at or below the poverty line; 32.4% of the population aged 65 and older were at or below the poverty line.

Arts and culture
Rayne holds a yearly Frog Festival the second full weekend in November as of 2008. The festival, which used to be held on the first full weekend of September following Labor Day, attracts thousands of visitors. As of 2015, the festival is held Mother's Day weekend.

Education
The Acadia Parish School Board serves the city. Rayne High School, home of the Mighty Wolves, is located in Rayne.

Other schools in Rayne include:
Central Rayne Kindergarten
Martin Pettijean Elementary
South Rayne Elementary
Armstrong Middle School
Rayne Catholic Elementary

Notable people
Cajun musicians Harry Choates, Joe Falcon, Jo-El Sonnier, Amedée Breaux, Johnnie Allan, Belton Richard, Lawrence Walker, and Tony Thibodeaux
Joshua Benton, director of Nieman Journalism Lab at Harvard University
Mike Heinen, professional golfer
Donnie Meche and Gerard Melancon, jockeys
Byron Mouton, former standout basketball player at Tulane and Maryland
Gerald Paddio, basketball player
Josh Reed, LSU standout and NFL wide receiver for the Buffalo Bills.
Ed Zaunbrecher, American football coach
Addison Rae (Easterling), American social media personality and dancer

Gallery

References

External links

City of Rayne official website

 
Populated places established in 1883
Cities in Louisiana
Cities in Acadia Parish, Louisiana
1883 establishments in Louisiana
Cities in Lafayette, Louisiana metropolitan area